Arthur Meyer may refer to:

 Arthur Meyer (journalist) (1844–1924), French journalist
 Arthur Meyer (botanist) (1850–1922), German botanist
 Arthur Meyer (American football) (1890–?), American college football and basketball player and coach